Paranemobius is a genus of cricket in the subfamily Nemobiinae; species can be found on the Indian subcontinent including Sri Lanka.

Species
The Orthoptera Species File lists:
Paranemobius pictus (Saussure, 1877)type species (as Pseudonemobius pictus Saussure)
Paranemobius vicinus Chopard, 1928

References

External links

Orthoptera genera
Trigonidiidae